Sepideh Raissadat is a classical Persian music singer.

Biography
Sepideh Raiissadaat 
Sepideh Raissadat was born in Tehran in 1980. She began studying Radif (the Repertoire of Persian classical music) at the age of 9 with the famous Persian singer Parisa and continued with Parviz Meshkatian and Mohammad Reza Lotfi. Her major soloist instrument is the Setar. Her first album was recorded when she was 18, thanks to Ostad Parviz Meshkatian.

After she finished her B.A. in Painting, she moved to Italy to pursue her artistic education. She graduated in Musicology majoring in Ethnomusicology from the University of Bologna. While in Italy, she was invited by the Vatican and different Italian TV channels and performed as a soloist with one of the oldest Italian choirs. She also performed with the most well-known Italian musicians such as Franco Battiato, Andrea Parodi, etc. Over the past few years, she has academically researched pre-Islamic ancient Persian music. Currently, her major research area is focused on Sassanid music.

Albums
"Persian Songs" performed with Nexus (ensemble), composed by Reza Ghassemi. August 2015. 
"Tambour inopiné" composed by Reza Ghassemi. September 2014.
"Rhapsody of Roses" composed by Iman Vaziri. July 2014.
"Tale of Friendship" composed by Iman Vaziri. October 2011.
"14 Cheerful Pieces" composed by Reza Ghassemi. Published by Buda Records, Oct,25 2010.
"Anwar – From Samarqand to Costantinople on the Footsteps of Maraghi" published by Felmay, 1 September 2010.
"Konje Sabouri" composed by Ostad Parviz Meshkatian
"Khonyagar" composed by Mehdi Azarsina

Televised Performances
BBC Persian channel Close-up (Az Nazdik) program about Sepideh Raissadat

External links
[http://www.sepidehraissadat.com Sepideh Raissadat's official Website
Pittsburgh Post-Gazette
Télérama (French art&culture weekly)

References

1980 births
Living people
Iranian musicians
People from Tehran
Iranian women singers
Iranian setar players
Persian-language singers
Iranian expatriates in Canada
Iranian expatriates in Germany
Italian people of Iranian descent
21st-century Iranian women singers